Usermaatre Setepenre Pami was an ancient Egyptian pharaoh of the 22nd Dynasty who ruled for 7 years. "Pami" in Egyptian, means "the Cat" or "He who belongs to the Cat [Bastet]".

Identity
Pami's precise relationship with his immediate predecessor Shoshenq IV is unknown. He is attested as the father of Shoshenq V in a stela from the Serapeum of Saqqara, dating to the eleventh year of the latter's reign. 

Pami was once assumed to be Pimay, the third son of Shoshenq III who served as the "Great Chief of Ma" under his father. However, the different orthographies of their names (Pami vs. Pimay) prove that they were 2 different individuals. 

The name Pami translates as 'The Cat' in Egyptian whereas the name Pimay means 'The Lion.' Pami's name was mistakenly transcribed as Pimay by past historians based upon the identification with Shoshenq III's son. While a previous Dynasty 22 king held the title 'Great Chief of the Ma' before ascending the throne–namely Shoshenq I–Shoshenq III's son, if Pimay did indeed outlive his father, he should have then succeeded his father as king rather than the obscure Shoshenq IV who is not attested as a son of Shoshenq III. Consequently, it seems certain that Shoshenq III outlived all of his sons through his nearly four-decade-long reign.

While a minority of scholars hold to the traditional view that Pami was Pimay, no archaeological evidence proves that Pami was ever a son of Shoshenq III. Pami may have been a son of his obscure predecessor Shoshenq IV instead.

Reign length

According to stelae from the Serapeum of Saqqara, an Apis bull was buried in the second year of Pami's reign.

On a reused stone block from an enclosure wall at Heliopolis, annals were found which document the deeds of various Twenty-second Dynasty pharaohs, however, only the section concerning Pami's reign had survived. It chronicles the king's annual donations to both the gods of the Great Temple of Heliopolis and to other local deities and temples in this city. While the ending of the block is damaged, the donation of the 7th regnal year can be clearly seen for Pami, with an entry for the subsequent year being possible.

References

External links
dynasties

778 BC deaths
8th-century BC Pharaohs
Pharaohs of the Twenty-second Dynasty of Egypt
Year of birth unknown